Timetrap is an original-series Star Trek novel by David Dvorkin, published by Pocket Books in 1988. For the week of June 12, 1988, Timetrap was the fifth-best-selling paperback book on The New York Times Best Seller list. Timetrap is Pocket's 40th numbered novel from the retronymed Star Trek: The Original Series. Simon & Schuster released an e-book version in September 2000.

The plot of the novel concerns Captain Kirk's kidnapping and brainwashing by Klingons to believe that he's time-traveled 100 years into his future.  Ellen Cheeseman-Meyer, writing for Tor.com, described the story as dealing with the philosophy of perception and "drugs. Lots and lots of drugs."

See also
 List of Star Trek novels

References

External links

1988 American novels
Klingons
novels about time travel
novels based on Star Trek: The Original Series